The London and North Western Railway (LNWR) 19in Express Goods Class, otherwise known as the Experiment Goods Class was a class of 4-6-0 steam locomotives.  They were essentially a smaller wheeled version of the Whale's Experiment Class and were an early attempt at a mixed traffic engine.

Career
Crewe built 170 engines between 1906 and 1909.  The LNWR reused numbers from withdrawn locomotives, so the numbering was haphazard.  All passed onto LMS ownership in 1923.  The LMS gave them the power classification 4F.  The LMS renumbered them into the more logical series 8700–8869.  Withdrawals started in 1931.  British Railways acquired three 8801/24/34 in 1948, but all were withdrawn by 1950 before they could receive their allocated numbers 48801/24/34.  None were preserved.

References

External links 
 LNWRS page
 railuk page

Experiment Goods
4-6-0 locomotives
Railway locomotives introduced in 1906
Standard gauge steam locomotives of Great Britain